Srednji Petrovići is a village in the municipality of Krupa na Uni, part of the Republika Srpska entity of Bosnia and Herzegovina.

Demographics 
According to the 2013 census, its population was 2, both Bosniaks.

References

Populated places in Krupa na Uni